The Marine 2 is a 2009 American action film directed by Roel Reiné, written by Christopher Borrelli and John Chapin Morgan, and produced by Michael Lake. The film stars are Ted DiBiase Jr., Temuera Morrison, Lara Cox, Robert Coleby and Michael Rooker. It is the stand-alone sequel to The Marine, starring John Cena, and it is the second in the film series. This was Ted DiBiase's film debut. The film was released on DVD and Blu-ray in the United States on December 29, 2009.

The film was inspired by the Dos Palmas kidnappings.

The film was produced by the films division of WWE, called WWE Studios, and distributed in the United States by 20th Century Fox Home Entertainment.

Plot
Joe Linwood (Ted DiBiase, Jr.) of the US Marine Force Recon attempts to rescue his wife Robin (Lara Cox), and other guests from a hotel which has been taken over by a gang of bloodthirsty terrorists.  The Linwoods are vacationing at the lavish Thailand resort when the terrorists invade during the hotel's grand opening.  Joe escapes the initial onslaught and must find a way to save his wife and the other hostages.

Cast
Ted DiBiase Jr. as Joe Linwood
Temuera Morrison as Damo, terrorist leader
Lara Cox as Robin Linwood, Joe's wife
Robert Coleby as Darren Conner, billionaire
Michael Rooker as Church, US Army veteran
Kelly B. Jones as Cynthia
Sahajak Boonthanakit as Shoal, corrupt government official
Dom Hetrakul as Calob
Marina Ponomareva as Lexi
Levern Gibbs as Spotter
Tsyun Malherbe as Young Tourist
Able Wanamakok as Reporter on TV
Thienchai Jayasvasit as Thickset
Kawee Sirikanaerut as Bantoc
Pongsanart Vinsiri as Military Commander
Supoj Khaowwong as Blondie

Casting
WWE wrestler and real-life former Marine Randy Orton was set to play the lead role. He had to decline, due to a collarbone injury.

Sequel
A sequel, The Marine 3: Homefront, was released on March 5, 2013. It stars WWE wrestler Mike "The Miz" Mizanin in the lead role. Randy Orton was initially cast in the lead role; however, due to his previous negative association with the Marine Corps, he was replaced by Mizanin.

References

External links
 

2009 films
2009 action films
20th Century Fox direct-to-video films
American action films
2000s English-language films
Films directed by Roel Reiné
Films shot in Thailand
Muay Thai films
American Muay Thai films
Direct-to-video sequel films
Films about the United States Marine Corps
WWE Studios films
2000s American films